Andriy Leonidovych Guzenko (born 19 February 1973) is a Ukrainian football coach and former player.

Honours
FC Irtysh Pavlodar
Kazakhstan Premier League: 2003

External links
 

1973 births
People from Nikopol, Ukraine
Living people
FC Elektrometalurh-NZF Nikopol players
Soviet footballers
FC CSKA Kyiv players
Ukrainian footballers
FC Nyva Myronivka players
FC Karpaty Lviv players
Kazakhstan Premier League players
Ukrainian Premier League players
FC Vorskla Poltava players
FC Torpedo Zaporizhzhia players
MFC Mykolaiv players
PFC Krylia Sovetov Samara players
Ukrainian expatriate footballers
Expatriate footballers in Russia
Russian Premier League players
FC Vorskla-2 Poltava players
FC Irtysh Pavlodar players
Expatriate footballers in Kazakhstan
FC Kyzylzhar players
FC Atyrau players
FC Krystal Kherson players
Ukrainian football managers
FC Stal Kamianske managers
Association football midfielders
Sportspeople from Dnipropetrovsk Oblast